Louis Craig Cornish (18 April 1870 – 7 January 1950) was an American religious leader who served as president of the American Unitarian Association (1927–1937).

During that period, the Great Depression made it difficult for him to carry out his duties. But he worked for international religious cooperation and led an investigation in the 1920s into the alleged persecution of Unitarians in Romania. He also visited the Philippines to establish connections with Unitarians there following the theological leadership of Bishop Gregorio Aglipay. Corinth and his wife Frances Eliot Foote Cornish co-authored a book about the Independent Church movement in the Philippines in 1942, The Philippines Calling. In 1947 he published Transylvania, The Land Beyond the Forest.

A "Louis C. Cornish 'Living the Mission' Award" has been awarded since 1999 in his honor by the Unitarian Universalist Partner Church Council (UUPCC).

External links
 
Frances Eliot Foote Cornish, Louis Craig Cornish: Interpreter of life (Boston: Beacon Press, 1953)
"UUPCC awards"

1870 births
1950 deaths
American Unitarians